Henry Richard Camelli (December 9, 1914 – July 14, 1996) was an American professional baseball player.

Camelli's professional baseball career stretched over 16 seasons (1935–48; 1950–51), with 13 years in minor league baseball as a player and playing manager, including 1940 when at age 25 he was the catcher/manager of the Saginaw Athletics of the Class C Michigan State League. During one stretch that season, Camelli caught six doubleheaders in a row. He appeared in single games for the 1943 and 1945 Pirates, the latter because of military service in the United States Army. Overall, he appeared in 159 games in all or parts of five Major League campaigns.

On September 30, 1946, he was included in a multiplayer trade that sent him to his hometown Braves with third baseman Bob Elliott for future Hall of Fame second baseman Billy Herman, pitcher Elmer Singleton, outfielder Stan Wentzel and infielder Whitey Wietelmann. Herman was promptly named playing manager of the 1947 Pirates, but he was aghast at the cost — Elliott — the Pirates had paid for him. "Why, they've gone and traded the whole team on me", he said. Elliott would win the  National League Most Valuable Player award and lead Boston to the 1948 National League pennant. Herman's 1947 Pirates lost 92 games and finished tied for seventh in the NL, and he resigned before the season's final game.

Camelli was Boston's second-string catcher (behind Phil Masi) in 1947, his final season in the Majors. The Braves then sent him to the San Diego Padres of the AAA Pacific Coast League for 1948. He died in Wellesley, Massachusetts, at the age of 81.

References

External links

1914 births
1996 deaths
Abbeville A's players
Albany Senators players
Baseball players from Massachusetts
Boston Braves players
Chattanooga Lookouts players
Major League Baseball catchers
Minneapolis Millers (baseball) players
People from Wellesley, Massachusetts
Pittsburgh Pirates players
Portsmouth Cubs players
Saginaw Bears players
St. Hyacinthe Saints players
San Diego Padres (minor league) players
Selma Cloverleafs players
Sportspeople from Gloucester, Massachusetts
Toronto Maple Leafs (International League) players
Tyler Trojans players
Williamsport Grays players
United States Army personnel of World War II